Moirans-en-Montagne is a commune in the Jura department in Bourgogne-Franche-Comté in eastern France.

The village houses the Toy Museum (Musée du Jouet).

Population

Gallery

See also 
 Communes of the Jura department

References 

Communes of Jura (department)